Golby Run is a  long tributary to Pine Creek in Warren County and Venango Counties, Pennsylvania.

Course
Golby Run rises about 0.5 miles northeast of Pleasantville, Pennsylvania in Venango County and then flows north into Warren County to Pine Creek about 0.5 miles east of Enterprise, Pennsylvania.

Watershed
Golby Run drains  of area, receives about 44.8 in/year of precipitation, and has a wetness index of 434.35 and is about 87% forested.

References

Additional Maps

Rivers of Pennsylvania
Rivers of Venango County, Pennsylvania
Rivers of Warren County, Pennsylvania